Lunovula finleyi is a species of sea snail, a marine gastropod mollusk in the family Ovulidae, one of the families of cowry allies.

Description

Distribution
This marine species occurs off the Tuamotu Archipelago.

References

 Rosenberg, G. (1990). Lunovula, a new genus of the Ovulidae (Prosobranchia: Gastropoda). Venus. 49: 189-197.
 Lorenz F. & Fehse D. (2009) The living Ovulidae. A manual of the families of allied cowries: Ovulidae, Pediculariidae and Eocypraeidae. Hackenheim: Conchbooks.
 Lorenz F. & Bouchet P. (2018). A new species of Lunovula from the South Pacific (Gastropoda: Ovulidae, Pediculariinae). Conchylia. 48(3-4): 15-18

finleyi
Gastropods described in 1990